Benton Springs is an unincorporated community in Polk County, in the U.S. state of Tennessee.

The community was named for Thomas Hart Benton, a Missouri politician.

References

Unincorporated communities in Polk County, Tennessee
Unincorporated communities in Tennessee